Neervalur is a village located around 15 km from Kanchipuram, in the Indian state of Tamil Nadu. It is known for its temple of Lord lakshminarayana which is stated to be 500 years old.  This temple also has a shrine for Lord Jwala Narasimha.

Legend 
It was also known as Sri Bashyapuram in the past, a reference to Sri Bhashya written by Saint Ramanuja. Even today, the temple comes under the control of Ahobila Mutt.

References

  Website of the Lakshmi Narayana Temple

Villages in Kanchipuram district